Crimson is the tenth studio album by Japanese singer Akina Nakamori. It was released on 24 December 1986 under the Warner Pioneer label. The album includes original version of Eki.

Background
Crimson is second studio album released in year 1986, after four months from previous studio album Fushigi. The music production team consist two writers: Mariya Takeuchi, Akiko Kobayashi and two arrangers, Shiro Sagisu and Kazuo Shiina.

The album consist of any previously released single and includes 10 new songs recorded. Nakamori sings with whisper or silent voice, which is not usual for the people who know her as a singer with a powerful vibrato. Each of the songs has balladic melody line, in the comparison with previous studio album Fushigi.

Eki is one of her the most famous album tracks, however the song became more famous after Takeuchi's cover, which was released in 1987 as a b-side track of single After Years. Takeuchi version was used as a theme song in the movie Good-bye, Mama. In this album, arrange is provided by Shiina, while Takeuchi's version arrangement is provided by Tatsuro Yamashita. In 2002, Nakamori self-cover this song in her first self-cover album Utahime Double Decade with arrangement by Akira Senju.

Mick Jagger ni Hohoemi wos sound effect idea was made by Nakamori herself, imagining herself in room, preparing breakfast and play from cassette tape player her own songs. The original version of Mick Jagger ni Hohoemi wo is included in the CD-Box Akina released in 1993.

Stage performances
In Fuji TV music television program Yoru no Hit Studio, Nakamori performed Mick Jagger ni Hohoemi wo, Yakusoku and Oh No, Oh Yes in 1987 and Eki in 1993 as part of segment Request songs by viewers.

Mind Game, Mosaic no Shiro, Akai no Enamel, Pink Champagne and Jealous Candle were performed in Nakamori's live tour A Hundred Days.

Charting performance
The album reached number 1 on the Oricon Album Weekly Charts. LP Record version charted 23 weeks, Cassette tape charted 22 weeks and CD version charted 21 weeks. The album remained at number 3 on the Oricon Album Yearly Charts in 1987. As result, in the December 1987 it was nominated in 29th Japan Record Awards and won title The Album of the Year.

Track listingNotes:'''
"Mind Game," "Oh No, Oh Yes!" and "Jealous Candle" are stylised in all uppercase.
"Mick Jagger ni Hohoemi wo" begins with an excerpt of "Aka no Enamel."

Covers
Mariya Takeuchi covers version
Mariya Takeuchi covered all five songs she wrote for Nakamori.Eki was released at first in the single After years as a b-side track, later in her compilation albums Impression and Expression.Oh No, Oh Yes! was released at first in the single Genki o Dashite as a B-side track and later in the studio album Request.Yakusoku was released as a b-side track of single Junai Rhapsody and later in first limited edition of studio album Denim.Aka no Enamel was included in the reprinted version of studio album Variety in 2014 as a demo-tapeMick Jagger ni Hohoemi wo was included in the compilation album Mariya's Songsbook'' as a demo-tape as well.

Cover versions by other artist

Oh No Oh Yes
Anita Mui: Lit Yim Hong Sun, 1987

Eki
Kenichi Mikawa: Golden Paradise, 1991
Yuko Nakazawa: Nakazawa Yuuko Dai 1 Shou, 1998
Hideaki Tokunaga: Vocalist, 2005
Ryoko Moriyama: Haru Natsu Aki Fuyu, 2008
Marty Friedman: Tokyo Jukebox, 2009
Akira Fuse: Ballade II, 2010
Juju: Snack JUJU: Yoru no Request, 2016

References

1986 albums
Japanese-language albums
Akina Nakamori albums
Warner Music Japan albums